Drastic Fantastic is the second studio album by Scottish singer-songwriter KT Tunstall. It features some unreleased tracks she wrote before Eye to the Telescope such as new tracks she wrote in 2003. The record was released by Relentless Records on 10 September 2007 in the United Kingdom and elsewhere in Europe, on 15 September in Australia, and 18 September 2007 in the United States and Canada. However, the album was leaked on P2P networks on 3 September 2007.

Some additional tracks features other unreleased songs such as "Mothgirl", "Bad Day" and "Journey", and during the Drastic Fantastic Tour, Tunstall covered "La Vie En Rose", which is on the U.K Bonus tracks, "My Sharona", The Bangles' "Walk Like an Egyptian" and Chaka Khan's "Ain't Nobody" which features on the DVD. Also, three singles were taken from Drastic Fantastic: "Hold On", the lead single, "Saving My Face" and "If Only", which all charted in the UK Top 100.

On the US Billboard 200 chart, Drastic Fantastic debuted at number nine, selling about 50,000 copies in its first week, and sold around 225,000 copies in 2007.

The album was reissued on 15 January 2021 in vinyl, triple-disc, and digital formats as Drastic Fantastic: Ultimate Edition, consisting of previously unreleased songs and remixes.

Artwork
According to Tunstall, the album cover is based on Suzi Quatro.

Critical reception

The album received warm, though conservative, praise by most critics. Music critics from The Observer gave Drastic Fantastic five stars, stating the album was "bursting with so many hits that Tunstall's comic-book life is about to go stratospheric". Rob Sheffield of Rolling Stone gave the album three-and-a-half stars out of five, and said that the album's sound was a "flashback" to 1997 by noting similarities between the songs on Drastic Fantastic and songs written 10 years earlier. Stephen Thomas Erlewine of Allmusic gave the album four out of five, calling Drastic Fantastic "a rare beast: a pop album with a songwriter's heart".

However, some critics were less impressed, stating that the album was overproduced and lacked the "folksy" touch of her previous album Eye to the Telescope. The Guardian gave it three stars, stating "Tunstall could do better".

Track listing
All tracks produced by Steve Osbourne.

In addition with the Deluxe edition, a documentary DVD with the album.

Most songs on Drastic Fantastic are not new songs. An acoustic version of "Little Favours" and "Paper Aeroplane" appeared on the 2000 demo album Tracks in July. "Little Favours" also appeared as the B-side to "Under the Weather". "If Only", "Funnyman", and "Saving My Face" appeared on the demo album Toons March '03. Finally, Tunstall mentioned writing two new songs, "Hopeless" and "White Bird", in a blog entry from 2003.

The bonus track "Journey" appeared on KT Tunstall's early band Red Light Stylus' album Roughworks, under the title "The Journey's the Thing".

Singles
"Hold On" was released as the album's lead single on 16 July 2007 in the United States, and on 27 August in the United Kingdom.
"Saving My Face" was chosen as the second single; it was released on 12 November 2007.
"If Only" was released on 3 March 2008.
 A video for the song "Little Favours" was released in many music channels of Brazil (such as MTV Brasil & Multishow). The video is directed by Chris Bran, did not feature KT and only shows a KT Tunstall fan and ex-teacher Mr. Fritte with a puppet with strings, that he calls The Tunstallator.
The song is featured on the Brazilian soap opera Três Irmãs.

"Someday Soon" is available as a single on Internet music stores such as iTunes and Rhapsody. It was featured in the film The Women in a montage featuring Annette Bening and Meg Ryan.

Personnel
 KT Tunstall – vocals, guitar, piano
 Luke Bullen – drums, percussion
 Sam Lewis – backing guitar
 Steve Osborne – bass, backing guitar, keyboards
 Arnulf Lindner – bass, double bass
 Kenny Dickenson – piano, keyboards
 Cat Sforza – backing vocals
 Gita Harcourt – backing vocals

Charts and certifications

Chart positions

Certifications

Release history

References

2007 albums
KT Tunstall albums
Albums produced by Steve Osborne
Virgin Records singles
Albums recorded at Rockfield Studios